"Angels of the Silences" is a song by American alternative rock band Counting Crows. It is the lead single and second track from their second album, Recovering the Satellites (1996). The song peaked at number three on the US Billboard Modern Rock Tracks chart, making it the highest-placing single from the album.

Background
Adam Duritz said about that song (from Storytellers):

Composition
Similar to the content of the rest of Recovering the Satellites, the song has a heavier sound than that of Counting Crows' debut, August and Everything After, incorporating distorted guitar riffs, blearier production, and higher emphasis on percussion to create a driving and dirty instrumental. The song is in the key of A-flat Minor, with a chord structure of i-(b)II-VI-III and a tempo of 160 BPM.

Track listing

Personnel
 David Bryson – guitar
 Adam Duritz – lead vocals
 Charlie Gillingham – Hammond B-3, background vocals
 Matt Malley – electric bass
 Ben Mize – drums
 Dan Vickrey – guitar

Charts

Release history

References

Counting Crows songs
1996 singles
1996 songs
DGC Records singles
Geffen Records singles
Song recordings produced by Gil Norton
Songs written by Adam Duritz
Songs written by Charlie Gillingham
Songs written by Dan Vickrey
Songs written by David Bryson